Cheng Huang may refer to:
City God (China), deities in Chinese mythology
Huang Cheng (born 1982), Chinese Paralympic rower